Johannes Bühler (born 26 July 1997) is a German footballer who plays as a midfielder.

Club career
After 3 years with 1899 Hoffenheim, he quit the club in July 2018 but joined Fortuna Düsseldorf six months later, who sent him directly on loan to VfR Aalen.

References

1997 births
Footballers from Hesse
Living people
People from Alsfeld
Sportspeople from Giessen (region)
German footballers
Germany youth international footballers
Association football defenders
TSG 1899 Hoffenheim II players
TSG 1899 Hoffenheim players
Fortuna Düsseldorf players
VfR Aalen players
BSV Schwarz-Weiß Rehden players
Regionalliga players
3. Liga players